The 1924 Western Kentucky State Normal football team represented Western Kentucky State Normal School and Teachers College (now known as Western Kentucky University) in the 1924 college football season.  They were coached by Edgar Diddle in his third year.

Schedule

References

Western Kentucky State Normal
Western Kentucky Hilltoppers football seasons
Western Kentucky State Normal football